Alessandro Egizio (1597–1689) was a Roman Catholic prelate who served as Bishop of Andria (1657–1689).

Biography
Alessandro Egizio was born in Minervino, Italy in 1597.
On 17 December 1657, he was appointed during the papacy of Pope Alexander VII as Bishop of Andria. He served as Bishop of Andria until his death in April 1689.

References

External links and additional sources
 (for Chronology of Bishops) 
 (for Chronology of Bishops) 

17th-century Italian Roman Catholic bishops
Bishops appointed by Pope Alexander VII
1597 births
1689 deaths